Syntrophaceticus schinkii is a species of strictly anaerobic, mesophilic, endospore-forming, syntrophic, acetate-oxidizing bacterium, the type species of its genus. Its type strain is Sp3T (=JCM 16669T), which was isolated from an anaerobic filter treating wastewater in a fishmeal factory.

References

Further reading

Westerholm, Maria. Biogas production through the syntrophic acetate-oxidising pathway. Vol. 2012. No. 45. 2012.

External links

LPSN
Type strain of Syntrophaceticus schinkii at BacDive -  the Bacterial Diversity Metadatabase

Thermoanaerobacterales
Bacteria described in 2011
Anaerobes